Liz W. Garcia is an American television producer and writer.

Career
As a writer her credits include Dawson's Creek, Wonderfalls and Cold Case (also executive story editor and consulting producer).

Garcia's film credits include working as a production assistant on the 1988 film Return of the Killer Tomatoes. She was also an assistant to Ed Decter and John J. Strauss in the 2002 film The New Guy.
 
In 2010, she co-created the TNT series Memphis Beat starring Jason Lee. She co-created the series with her husband, actor Joshua Harto. The series ended the following year after two seasons.

Garcia wrote and directed The Lifeguard, which began filming in July 2012 starring Kristen Bell. She also wrote and directed One Percent More Humid, starring Juno Temple and Julia Garner, which was released in 2017.

More recently, she signed an overall deal with Entertainment One.

Personal life
Garcia is a graduate of Wesleyan University. She married actor Joshua Harto in 2008, and they have a son together.

References

External links

1977 births
American television producers
American women television producers
American television writers
Living people
Wesleyan University alumni
American women television writers
Date of birth missing (living people)
Place of birth missing (living people)
American writers of Mexican descent
21st-century American women